The 2009 Tro-Bro Léon was the 26th edition of the Tro-Bro Léon cycle race and was held on 19 April 2009. The race was won by Saïd Haddou.

General classification

References

2009
2009 in road cycling
2009 in French sport